Georg Amft (25 January 1873–9 March 1937) was a German musician. He was born in Oberhannsdorf in the German Empire (now Jaszkowa Górna in Poland). He died in Bad Altheide, Germany (now Polanica-Zdrój in Poland).

1873 births
1937 deaths
German male musicians